Maplewood State Park is a state park of Minnesota, United States, near Pelican Rapids. The park preserves a pre-contact habitation site that was occupied in two different periods (650–900 CE and 1450–1650 CE) in a forest/prairie transition zone.  Located in the Leaf Mountains, Maplewood encompasses  in Otter Tail County and is known for its hardwood trees including sugar maple, basswood, American elm, and oak, which together provide a display of fall colors each year.

It became a state park in 1965, and an archeological site within the park, the Maplewood Site, was listed on the National Register of Historic Places in 1978.

Popular culture
Jim Fletcher, the author of The Lore Adventure Trilogy, built several small villages with the help of students of the Pelican Rapids High School and other local people. Several of these villages are placed in Maplewood State Park. One is accessible by a hiking trail, while another is located inside one of the lakes. Those are two of the known locations, while there may be many others inside of Maplewood.

Gallery

References

External links

Maplewood State Park photos and information
Maplewood State Park website

1963 establishments in Minnesota
Archaeological sites on the National Register of Historic Places in Minnesota
Protected areas established in 1963
Protected areas of Otter Tail County, Minnesota
State parks of Minnesota
National Register of Historic Places in Otter Tail County, Minnesota